The Ulaanbaatar Trade and Economic Representative Office, is the representative office of Mongolia in Taiwan, functioning as a de facto embassy in the absence of diplomatic relations.

Its counterpart is the Taipei Trade and Economic Representative Office in Ulaanbaatar. The Taiwan External Trade Development Council previously established a Taiwan Trade Center in June 2002.

History

ROC recognized Mongolia's independence on 14 August 1945 and revoked on 24 February 1953 after the Soviet Union supported the Communists. It re-recognized Mongolia's independence on 3 October 2002 and the representative office was established in December 2003.

See also
 List of diplomatic missions in Taiwan
 List of diplomatic missions of Mongolia
 Mongolia–Taiwan relations

References

2003 establishments in Taiwan
Diplomatic missions of Mongolia
Mongolia
Organizations established in 2003
Mongolia–Taiwan relations